"Hann (Alone)" (stylized as "HANN (Alone)") is a song recorded by South Korean girl group (G)I-dle. It was released on August 14, 2018, by Cube Entertainment as a digital single. A music video for the song was also released on August 14.

Composition 
The song was written by member Soyeon, who co-produced the song with Big Sancho. Billboard described the song as a "creeping" dance-pop song built on sleek strings, echoing harmonies and vibrant, tinny percussion. The lyrics talk about trying to forget a past lover.

Release 
The song was released as a digital single on August 14, 2018, through several music portals, including MelOn and iTunes.

Commercial performance 
"Hann" debuted at number 14 on the Gaon Digital Chart on the week ending August 18 and peaked at number 8 the following week. It also debuted at number 20 on Billboard Korea's K-pop Hot 100 on the week ending August 19 and peaked at number 10 in its fourth week.

It also debuted at number 2 on the US Billboard World Digital Songs, with more than 1,000 copies sold and hitting a new peak on the chart.

The song placed at number 23 for the month of August 2018.

"Hann" ranks 77 on Bugs 2018 Year End Top 100 and ranks No. 3 on Dazed's 20 Best K-pop songs of 2018.

Credits and personnel 
Credits are adapted from Melon.
 (G)I-dle – vocals
 Soyeon – producing, songwriting, arranger, organ
 Minnie – whistle
 Big Sancho – producing, arranger, piano, synthesizer
 Jeon Jae-hee – chorus
 Jeon Yeon  – record engineering, Recording
 Mr. Cho  – mixed
 Kwon Nam-woo  – mastering

Music video 
The music video was released simultaneously with the single on August 14. Within 12 hours, the video surpassed 2 million views on YouTube. On August 22, 2019, it has reached 100 million views on YouTube. Making this (G)I-dle's second music video to reach a 100 million views.

The scene when Soyeon tamed a scorpion was listed at #10 on Refinery29 K-Pop's Fiercest Music Video Moments of 2018.

Accolades

Charts

Weekly charts

Monthly chart

See also 
 List of M Countdown Chart winners (2018)

References 

(G)I-dle songs
2018 singles
2018 songs
Cube Entertainment singles
Korean-language songs
Songs written by Jeon So-yeon